Metropolitan Benjamin or Veniamin (born Iván Afanásevich Fédchenkov, Иван Афанасьевич Федченков; 14 September 1880 – 4 October 1961) was a bishop of the Russian Church, Orthodox missionary and writer.

Family 
His family consisted of two children and a wife.

Education 
Benjamin Fedchenkov was born in the village of selo Vazhki (Ilyinka), Tambov Governorate.

1917–1920. White movement 
Benjamin supported the White movement and closely cooperated with Wrangel's army of the Crimean peninsula. Benjamin emigrated in November 1920 together with the defeated soldiers of the Wrangel army and other fugitives.

Loyalty to Moscow Patriarchate 
1933–1947 was Exarch of Moscow Patriarchate in North America.

From April 19, 1932, was Archbishop.

From July 14, 1938, was Metropolitan of the Aleutians and North America.

Return 
1947–1951 was Metropolitan of Riga and Latvia.

1951–1955 was Metropolitan of Rostov and Novocherkassk (from February 8, 1954, Metropolitan of Rostov and Kamensk).

November 28, 1955 – February 20, 1958 was Metropolitan of Saratov and Balashov (from December 26, 1957, Metropolitan of Saratov and Volsk).

Late life 
He died in Pskovo-Pechorsky Monastery, and is buried in the caves of the monastery.

Sources 
 (Russian) Towards the canonization of Metropolitan Veniamin (Fedchenkov) 
 (Russian) Short biography and the list of Metropolitan Veniamin's works on the site "Russian Orthodoxy"

1880 births
1961 deaths
People from Tambov Oblast
People from Kirsanovsky Uyezd
Bishops of the Russian Orthodox Church
20th-century Eastern Orthodox bishops
Eastern Orthodox metropolitans
Eastern Orthodox missionaries
Russian Civil War
White Russian emigrants to the United States
White movement people
Eastern Orthodox monks